Yevamot ("Brother's Widow", also pronounced Yevamos, or Yavmus) is a tractate of the Talmud that deals with, among other concepts, the laws of Yibbum (loosely translated in English as levirate marriage), and, briefly, with conversion to Judaism.  This tractate is the first in the order of Nashim ("Women").

Yevamot, along with Eruvin and Niddah, is considered one of the three most difficult tractates in the Babylonian Talmud.

Contents
Yibbum is the Torah law by which the brother of a man who died without children is allowed and expected to marry the widow.  This law only applies to paternal brothers, i.e., brothers by the same father; whether they have the same mother or different mothers is irrelevant.  The deceased's widow(s) is forbidden to marry anyone else while waiting for one of the brothers to marry her, or release to her by performing a ceremony known as Halizah.  In any case where Yibbum applies, Halitsah may be performed as an alternative. There are numerous cases discussed in this tractate where Yibbum does not apply, and therefore Haliysah does not apply either. 
English translation for this type of union is “Levirate Marriage,” from the Latin “Levir,” which means brother in law.

Chapter headings
 Chamesh Esreh Nashim חמש עשרה נשים
 Keytzad Eshet Achiv כיצד אשת אחיו
 (Arba'ah Achim) (ארבעה אחים)
 Hacholetz Livamto החולץ ליבמתו
 Rabban Gamli'el רבן גמליאל
 Habba Al Yevimto הבא על יבמתו
 Almanah Lekhohen Gadol אלמנה לכהן גדול
 He'arel הערל
 Yesh Muttarot יש מותרות
 (Ha'ishah Shehalakh Balah Limdinat Hayam) (האישה שהלך בעלה למדינת הים)
 Nose'in Al Ha'anusah נושאין על האנוסה
 Mitzvat Chalitzah מצות חליצה
 Beit Shamay Omrim Eyn Mema'anin בית שמאי אומרים אין ממאנין 
 Cheresh Shennasa חרש שנשא
 Ha'ishah Shehalekhah Hi האשה שהלכה היא | Ha'ishah ... Shalom האשה ... שלום
 Ha'ishah Batra האשה בתרא | Ha'ishah Shehalekhah Balah Vetzaratah האשה שהלכה בעלה וצרתה

References

Talmud
Widow inheritance
Jewish marital law